Jan de Boer (born 20 May 2000) is a Dutch football player. He plays as a goalkeeper for Eredivisie club Groningen.

Career
de Boer joined Groningen in August 2019. He remained a backup for his first three seasons with the club.

He made his Eredivisie debut for Groningen on 23 October 2022 in a game against PSV Eindhoven. He was chosen player of the match for his performance in a 4–2 victory.

References

External links
 

2000 births
People from Sneek
Footballers from Friesland
Living people
Dutch footballers
Association football goalkeepers
FC Groningen players
Eredivisie players